was a train station located in Sanjō, Niigata, Japan.

Lines 
Japanese National Railways
Yahiko Line (Closed section)

History
The station was opened on July 25, 1927 and closed on April 1, 1985.

Railway stations in Niigata Prefecture
Defunct railway stations in Japan
Railway stations in Japan opened in 1927
Railway stations closed in 1985